The Harpur (later Crewe and Harpur Crewe) Baronetcy, of Calke Abbey, Derbyshire was a title in the Baronetage of England. It was created on 8 September 1626 for Henry Harpur. He was a grandson of Richard Harpur, Justice of the Common Pleas, of Swarkestone Hall, Swarkestone, Derbyshire. The fourth Baronet was High Sheriff of Derbyshire in 1702. He married Catherine, daughter of Thomas Crewe, 2nd Baron Crew (see Baron Crew). The fifth Baronet sat as Member of Parliament for Worcester and Tamworth. The sixth Baronet was Member of Parliament for Derbyshire. The seventh Baronet assumed the alternative surname of Crewe in 1808 in commemoration of his ancestry. The eighth Baronet sat as Member of Parliament for Derbyshire South. The ninth Baronet assumed the surname Harpur Crewe and was High Sheriff of Derbyshire in 1853. The tenth Baronet was High Sheriff of Derbyshire in 1900. The title became extinct on his death in 1924.

The Derbyshire estate passed down on the female line and in 1949 was inherited by Charles Jenney, grandson of the last Baronet, who changed his name to Harpur-Crewe. Inheritance tax problems enforced the sale of the estate on his death in 1981 and in 1985 Calke Abbey passed to the National Trust.

Harpur, later Harpur Crewe baronets, of Calke Abbey (1626)

Sir Henry Harpur, 1st Baronet (1585–1638)
Sir John Harpur, 2nd Baronet (1616–1669)
Sir John Harpur, 3rd Baronet (1645–1681)
Sir John Harpur, 4th Baronet (1679–1741)
Sir Henry Harpur, 5th Baronet (1708–1748)
Sir Henry Harpur, 6th Baronet (1739–1789)
Sir Henry Crewe, 7th Baronet (1763–1819)
Sir George Crewe, 8th Baronet (1795–1844)
Sir John Harpur Crewe, 9th Baronet (1824–1886)
Sir Vauncey Harpur Crewe, 10th Baronet (1846–1924)

See also
Baron Crew

References
 Debrett's Baronetage of England  7th Edition (1839) pp 34/5 (Google Books)
 The Baronetage of England Vol I. Rev. William Betham (1801) pp. 277–282. Harpur Pedigree. Google Books
 

Extinct baronetcies in the Baronetage of England
1626 establishments in England